The 1999 Atlantic Coast Conference men's basketball tournament took place from March 4–7 in Charlotte, North Carolina, at the second Charlotte Coliseum. Duke won the championship game over North Carolina.  It was the first of an unprecedented five consecutive ACC Tournament championships. Duke's championship followed a perfect 16–0 record in conference play.  Elton Brand of Duke was tournament MVP.

Bracket

AP rankings at time of tournament

Awards and honors

Everett Case Award

All Tournament Teams

First Team

Second Team

References

External links
 

Tournament
ACC men's basketball tournament
College sports in North Carolina
Basketball competitions in Charlotte, North Carolina
ACC men's basketball tournament
ACC men's basketball tournament